Filth Pig is the sixth studio album by American industrial metal band Ministry, released on January 30, 1996, by Warner Bros. Records. The title was allegedly derived from a statement made in the British Houses of Parliament, in which the band's leader Al Jourgensen was described as a "filthy pig" for his onstage theatrics by MP Teddy Taylor.

Despite being the band's highest-charting album in the US, it was negatively received by reviewers, sharply divided the band's fanbase, and did not live up to the platinum-selling success of Psalm 69. Despite poor sales, the album entered several charts, peaking at the highest positions Ministry has ever achieved. This would be the last Ministry album with Mike Scaccia on guitar until 2004's Houses of the Molé.

Background 
Filth Pig marked a major shift artistically for the band from the previous album.  Jourgensen said everyone around him wanted him to continue making music similar to Psalm 69.  However, he wanted to move away from using samples and focus on a slower, heavier sound.  Jourgensen rejected any songs that sounded like their previous work.  

The 2002 live album Sphinctour was generally well received by critics.

Packaging
The album cover depicts a young man holding an American flag with raw meat dripping on his head and a badge on his chest that reads, "Don't blame me."

Track listing

Personnel

Ministry
 Al Jourgensen – vocals, keyboards, mandolin, harmonica, pedal steel, piano, production
 Paul Barker – bass, vocals (5), programming, production

Additional personnel
 Rey Washam – drums
 Louis Svitek – guitars
 Mike Scaccia – guitars
 William Rieflin – drums
 Esther Nevarez – backing vocals (5)
 Stella Katsoudas – backing vocals (5)
 Duane Buford – programming (uncredited)
 Michael Balch – programming (8, uncredited)
 Zlatko Hukic – engineer
 Brad Kopplin – engineer
 Bill Garcelon – assistant engineer
 Jamie Duffy – assistant engineer
 Matt Gibson – assistant engineer
 Ed Tinley – assistant engineer
 Whitney O'Keefe – assistant engineer
 Paul Elledge – art & design

Chart positions

Album

Singles

References

External links

1996 albums
Ministry (band) albums
Albums produced by Al Jourgensen
Warner Records albums
Sludge metal albums
Heavy metal albums by American artists